Mersin İdmanyurdu (also Mersin İdman Yurdu, Mersin İY, or MİY) Sports Club; located in Mersin, east Mediterranean coast of Turkey in 2011-2012. 2011–12 season was the 12th season of Mersin İdmanyurdu football team in Süper Lig, the top level division in Turkey. Mersin İdmanyurdu football team has finished 2010–11 season at 1st place in TFF First League. The team has promoted to 2011–12 Süper Lig. The aim of team was remaining in the league for the first year after promotion. MİY finished season at 13th place and remained in the league. Team participated in 2011–12 Turkish Cup and was eliminated at Round 3.

Ali Kahramanlı was club president. Nurullah Sağlam who won the 2010–11 TFF First League championship has continued as head coach. 11 of the players were saved in the team and some known players from Beşiktaş, Bursaspor and Sivasspor were transferred in pre-season. Attacking midfielder André Moritz was the most appeared player with 33 apps. Márcio Nobre who known as Mert Nobre in Turkey was the top goalscorer with ten goals.

Pre-season
MİY team started to first preparation camp period in Isparta, Davraz on 27 June 2011. Preparation games:
 04.07.2011 - MİY-Metalurg (UKR): 1–1. Monday, 17:00. Isparta, Davraz. Goal: Andre Moritz.
 06.07.2011 - MİY-Inter Baku (AZE): 3–3. Wednesday. Isparta, Davraz, Sirena Hotel. Goals: Kamanan 55', Erman Özgür 90' and Moritz 65'.
 12.07.2011 - MİY-Terek (RUS): 1–1. Tuesday. Isparta, Davraz, Sirena Hotel. Goal: Moritz.

First camp period ended on 12 July 2011. Second camp period started in Austria, on 17 July 2011. Planned preparation games could not be played during Austria camp due to several reasons. One preparation game was played:
 19.07.2011 - MİY-Górnik Zabrze (POL): 1-1 . Tuesday, 18:00. Dilly Hotel, Windischgarsten, Austria. Goal: Erhan Güven 44'.

Second camp period ended on 30 July 2011. A third camp period is being planned because a delay in the 2011–12 Süper Lig is in the concern due to manipulation matters which TFF deals with. Preceding to the third camp, MİY attended in a tournament in Ankara, which Ankaragücü club organized and the revenue obtained from the audience was donated to people suffering from famine in Somalia. The games played in this tournament were:
 11.08.2011 - Gençlerbirliği-MİY: 1-3. Thursday, 19:00. Saray Spor Tesisleri, Ankara. Goals: Nduka 1', Kamanan 17', 32'.
 12.08.2011 - Sivasspor-MİY: 2-2. Friday, 21:00. Saray Spor Tesisleri, Ankara. Goals: Nobre 32', Kamanan 48'.
 14.08.2011 - MKE Ankaragücü-MİY: 4-0. Sunday, 21:00. classification game.

After TRT Cup played in Ankara, MİY remained in Ankaragücü sports complex. Three more preparation games were played before the start of the season:
 21.08.2011 - MİY-Kasımpaşa: 1-1. Sunday. Yenikent Asaş Stadium, Ankara. Goal: Joseph Boum.
 25.08.2011 - Gaziantepspor-MİY: 2-2. Thursday. Kamil Ocak Stadium, Gaziantep. Goals: Kamanan 17', Nduka 85'.
 27.08.2011 - Konyaspor-MİY: 2-1. Saturday, 21:00. Atatürk Stadium, Konya. Goals: Kamanan 49', İbrahim Kaş 69' (o.g.).

2011–12 Süper Lig participation
Mersin İdmanyurdu participated in 2011–12 Süper Lig. The league was played as "Spor-Toto Süper Lig" in that season due to sponsorship reasons. 18 teams attended. A play-off system introduced for the first time in league history. Top four teams play two-leg league system play-offs. The winners and runners-up of the play-off were qualify for 2012–13 UEFA Champions League (ECL). The team who finished the league at first place qualifies for ECL even if they could not finish the play-offs at top two places. The third team qualifies for 2012–13 UEFA Europa League (UEL). Second team who qualifies for UEL is determined by another play-off which is played by the teams who finished the normal season at 5th through 8th places. Bottom three teams relegate to 2012–13 TFF Second League. The start date of the league is 10 September 2011 and end date of normal season is 8 April 2012.

Mersin İdmanyurdu finished 2011–12 Süper Lig season at 14th place and did not participate in play-offs but remained in the league.

Results summary
Mersin İdmanyurdu (MİY) 2011–12 Süper Lig season results summary.

Sources: 2011–12 Süper Lig pages.

League table
Mersin İdmanyurdu (MİY) 2011–12 Süper Lig season standing in league table after normal season:

Results by round
Mersin İdmanyurdu (MİY) 2011–12 Süper Lig season standing in league table after normal season:

First half
Mersin İdmanyurdu (MİY) 2011–12 Süper Lig season first half game reports is shown in the following table.
Kick off times are in EET and EEST.

Sources: 2011–12 Süper Lig pages.

Second half
Mersin İdmanyurdu (MİY) 2011–12 Süper Lig season second half game reports is shown in the following table. 
Kick off times are in EET and EEST.

Sources: 2011–12 Süper Lig pages.

2011–12 Turkish Cup participation
Mersin İdmanyurdu has participated in 2011–12 Turkish Cup from the third round. Turkish Cup has been played in its 50th season with 57 teams as Ziraat Türkiye Kupası for sponsorship reasons. It was played in four elimination rounds and finals in one-leg elimination system. MİY took place in third elimination round and eliminated to Sivasspor. Sivasspor has been eliminated by Galatasaray in the fourth elimination round and Galatasaray was eliminated by Bursaspor in quarterfinals. Bursaspor has lost finals to Fenerbahçe who won the cup for the 5th time. Fenerbahçe had won its 4th Cup 29 seasons before against MİY in finals of 1982–83 Turkish Cup.

Cup track
The drawings and results Mersin İdmanyurdu (MİY) followed in 2011–12 Turkish Cup are shown in the following table.

Note: In the above table 'Score' shows For and Against goals whether the match played at home or not.

Game details
Mersin İdmanyurdu (MİY) 2011–12 Turkish Cup game reports is shown in the following table.
Kick off times are in EET and EEST.

Source: 2011–12 Ziraat Turkish Cup pages.

Management
 Club address was: Hamidiye Mah., İsmet İnönü Blv., Sevim Çalışkan Apt. No: 3/3, Mersin.
 Kit: Uniform Manufacturer: Hummel International. Chest Advertising's: SOIL. Back Advertising's: BPet. Shorts Advertising's: Özbal Çelik Boru.

Club management
 Executive committee: Mersin İdmanyurdu Sports Club president and managerial board members are elected by general vote of club members. Last election was held in September 2008. President: Ali Kahramanlı. Deputy Chairman: Abdi Kurt. Vice Presidents: Ayhan Erdem, Mustafa Ağaoğlu, Nuh Yüksel Güngör, Şerefettin Kadooğlu, Beşir Acar. Football Assistants in Charge of the Branch: Erhan Contar, Mehmet Hanifi Işık. Boxing Assistant in Charge of the Branch: Nafiz Deniz. Handball Assistant in Charge of the Branch: Onur Ünlü. Treasurer: M.Galip Akyollu. General Secretary: Senan İdin. General Manager: Salih Baysal. Press Agent: Celal Ata. Executive Committee Members: Ali Sönmez, H.Tufan Ballı, Sultan Torlak. Stadium Authority: İbrahim Çakar. 
 Other Personnel: General Manager: Murat Öğ. Financial Advisor: Sedat Aydöner. Club's Lawyer: Av.Osman Akgöç. Assistant General Manager: Burak Adanalı. Drivers: Ökkeş Aybar, Mustafa Kaya. Accountant: Özcan Ulusoy. Secretary: Duygu Gürani. Servant: Fatma Dağkaya. 
 Help Team: Physiotherapist: Mustafa Bozkurt. Interpreter: Berkant Demir. Masseurs: Ersoy Şenel, Kadir Ekinci. Outfitters: Ahmet Aksoylu, Ercan Şenol. Source: Club home page.

Coaching team
 During all season: Coach: Nurullah Sağlam. Trainer:İsmet Savcılıoğlu. Goalkeeper trainer: Sadık Öztürk. General manager: Serkan Damla.

2011–12 Mersin İdmanyurdu head coaches

Note: Only official games were included.

2011–12 squad
Appearances, goals and cards count for 2011–12 Süper Lig and 2011–12 Turkish Cup games. Only the players who appeared in game rosters were included. Kit numbers were allowed to select by players. 18 players appeared in each game roster, three to be replaced. Players are listed in order of appearance.

Sources: TFF club page and maçkolik team page.

U-21 team
Mersin İdmanyurdu U-21 team had participated in 2011–12 A2 League. League was played in three stages. In the first stage, 37 teams played ranking group games in 4 groups on regional basis. 3 consisted of 9 and 1 consisted of 10 teams. In the second stage winners and runners-up of each ranking group constituted final group while the rest played classification group games. In the third stage, winners of classification groups played quarterfinals with first four placed teams in final group. Mersin idmanyurdu U-21 team took place in Ranking Group 4 and finished 8th in the first stage. In the second stage the team took place in Classification Group 4 and finished 5th with 9 wins, 8 deuces and 15 losses.

See also
 Football in Turkey
 2011–12 Süper Lig
 2011–12 Turkish Cup

Notes and references

Mersin İdman Yurdu seasons
Mersin Idmanyurdu